Palaquium laevifolium is a species of plant in the family Sapotaceae. It is endemic to Sri Lanka.

References

laevifolium
Endemic flora of Sri Lanka
Trees of Sri Lanka
Critically endangered plants
Taxonomy articles created by Polbot